English singer and songwriter Corinne Bailey Rae has released three studio albums, one live album, four extended plays, 13 singles (including five as a featured artist), one promotional single and 13 music videos.

Rae released her eponymous debut album in February 2006. It debuted atop the UK Albums Chart, while reaching the top five in Ireland and the United States, and the top 10 in Canada, New Zealand and Switzerland. Corinne Bailey Rae was certified triple platinum by the British Phonographic Industry (BPI) and platinum by the Recording Industry Association of America (RIAA), selling over four million copies worldwide. The album spawned four singles, including "Put Your Records On", which peaked at number two on the UK Singles Chart.

Rae's second studio album, The Sea, was released in January 2010, reaching number five on the UK Albums Chart, number seven on the US Billboard 200 and number 13 on the Canadian Albums Chart. It was later certified gold by the BPI. The album was promoted by three singles: "I'd Do It All Again", "Paris Nights/New York Mornings" and "Closer". In May 2016, Rae released her third studio album, The Heart Speaks in Whispers, which peaked at number 14 on the UK Albums Chart.

Albums

Studio albums

Live albums

Extended plays

Singles

As lead artist

As featured artist

Promotional singles

Other charted songs

Guest appearances

Music videos

Notes

References

External links
 
 
 

Discography
Discographies of British artists
Rhythm and blues discographies
Soul music discographies